Glucuronoxylans are the primary components of hemicellulose as found in hardwood trees, for example birch.
They are hemicellulosic plant cell wall polysaccharides, containing glucuronic acid and xylose as its main constituents. They are linear polymers of β-D-xylopyranosyl units linked by (1→4) glycosidic bonds, with many of the xylose units substituted with 2, 3 or 2,3-linked glucuronate residue, which are often methylated at position 4. Most of the glucuronoxylans have single 4-O-methyl-α-D-glucopyranosyl uronate residues (MeGlcA) attached at position 2. This structural type is usually named as 4-O-methyl-D-glucurono-D-xylan (MGX).

Angiosperm (hardwood) glucuronoxylans also have a high rate of substitution (70-80%) by acetyl groups, at position 2 and/or 3 of the β-D-xylopyranosyl, conferring on the xylan its partial solubility in water.

References

Polysaccharides